Lisbeth Campbell is a Magistrate of the Australian Capital Territory. She was sworn in as a Magistrate on 5 August 1998.

She is the second woman to be appointed as a magistrate in the Australian Capital Territory.

References 

Magistrates of the Magistrates Court of the Australian Capital Territory
Living people
Year of birth missing (living people)
Australian magistrates